Statistics of Primera División Uruguaya for the 1939 season.

Overview
It was contested by 11 teams, and Nacional won the championship.

League standings

Playoff: Nacional-Peñarol 3-2

References
Uruguay - List of final tables (RSSSF)

Uruguayan Primera División seasons
Uru
1939 in Uruguayan football